Latimer may refer to:

Places

England
 Latimer, Buckinghamshire, a village
 Latimer and Ley Hill, a civil parish that until 2013 was just called "Latimer"
 Latimer, Leicester, an electoral ward and administrative division of the city of Leicester
 Burton Latimer, a small town in Northamptonshire

United States
 Latimer, Iowa, a city
 Latimer, Kansas, a city
 Latimer, Mississippi, a census-designated place
 Latimer County, Oklahoma
 Latimer Lake, Minnesota

People and fictional characters
 Latimer (surname), a list of people and fictional characters
 Latimer Whipple Ballou (1812–1900), U.S. Representative from Rhode Island
 Latimer Fuller (1870–1950), Anglican bishop, the second Bishop of Lebombo, South Africa
 Lewis Howard Latimer (1848–1928), Inventor

Other uses
 Baron Latimer, a title in the peerage of England and Britain, including a list of people who have held the title
 Latimer Arts College, a foundation secondary school in Barton Seagrave, Northamptonshire, England
 , a 1941 Empire ship
 , a US Navy World War II attack transport
 Latimer Park, a defunct English football stadium in Burton Latimer
 Viscount Latimer

See also
 Latimer diagram, a type of diagram used in electrochemistry
 R. v. Latimer (1997), a Canadian judicial decision
 R. v. Latimer (2001), a Canadian judicial decision
 Latimeria, a genus of fish
 Lattimer (disambiguation)
 Lattimore (disambiguation)
 Latymer (disambiguation)